The Arltarlpilta Community was a local government area in the Northern Territory of Australia.

Arltarlpilta Community came under the Local Government Act on 26 September 1997, combining the Atitjere, Mount Eaglebeak, Foxalls Wells, Irrelirre and Unpayekerke communities. On 1 July 2008, the community was merged into the Central Desert Shire, although the Community Government Council remained in existence as a Local Board, which meets at Atitjere.

Alcohol consumption is controlled in Arltarlpilta—it is a dry community.

See also
 Local government areas of the Northern Territory

References

Former local government areas of the Northern Territory
Aboriginal communities in the Northern Territory
2008 disestablishments in Australia